Simms Settlement is a rural community of the Municipality of The District of Chester in the Canadian province of Nova Scotia.

References
 Explore HRM

Communities in Halifax, Nova Scotia
General Service Areas in Nova Scotia